Caral Elizabeth Spangler (is an American government official who has served as the Assistant Secretary of the Army (Financial Management and Comptroller) since August 17, 2021.

Early life and education 
Spangler was born in Mankato, Minnesota. She earned a Bachelor of Arts degree in economics with honor from the School of Business at Michigan State University in 1980. She then obtained a Master of Public Administration degree from the Maxwell School of Citizenship and Public Affairs at Syracuse University in 1981.

Career 
Spangler began her career in the office of the Assistant Secretary of the Navy (Financial Management and Comptroller). She then worked in the office of the Under Secretary of Defense (Comptroller) and as a legislative aide for Congressman Norman Mineta of California. She later worked in the offices of the Assistant Secretary of the Air Force and Assistant Secretary of the Army (Financial Management and Comptroller), specializing in finance and budget issues. She served as acting auditor general of the United States Navy and acting assistant secretary of the United States Army.

Army Nomination
President Joe Biden nominated Spangler as Assistant Secretary of the Army (Financial Management and Comptroller) on June 3, 2021. She was approved the Senate Armed Services Committee on August 7 and confirmed by the entire Senate on August 9 by voice vote. She was sworn in on August 17, 2021.

References 

Living people
People from Mankato, Minnesota
Eli Broad College of Business alumni
Michigan State University alumni
Maxwell School of Citizenship and Public Affairs alumni
United States Department of Defense officials
Biden administration personnel
Year of birth missing (living people)